The National Shrine Basilica of Our Lady of Ransom aka Vallarpadam Basilica (Malayalam: വല്ലാര്‍പാടം പള്ളി, Cochin Portuguese: Basílica de Nossa Senhora do Resgate) located in Vallarpadam, a suburb in Ernakulam, in the city of Kochi, is a minor basilica and a major Christian pilgrimage centre in India. Around 5 million people visit the basilica every year. It is the most important Marian shrine in India. People from all parts of the world irrespective of caste or creed go to the church to seek the blessings of the Blessed Virgin Mary, mother of Jesus, popularly known as "Vallarpadathamma".

Change of status
The Roman Catholic Church has raised the historic Marian pilgrimage destination on the Vallarpadam Island to the status of a national pilgrim centre. The documents related to the raising of the status of the Our Lady of Ransom Church on the island were handed over recently to the Archbishop of Varappuzha Daniel Acharuparampil by the president of the Catholic Bishops' Conference of India, Cardinal Telesphore Toppo.

Location
Vallarpadam is situated next to Bolgatty Island on the west, and linked to the Ernakulam mainland via the new Goshree bridges. Vallarpadam is about one kilometer (½ mile) away from the Ernakulam mainland.

History

The picture of the Virgin Mary and Infant Jesus, installed at the top of the main altar of the Vallarpadam Church, was brought by Portuguese merchants under the leadership of Vasco da Gama in 1524. In 1676 the old church, which was known as the Church of the Holy Spirit, founded by the Portuguese missionaries, was destroyed by a heavy flood, and the picture was found floating in the backwaters. Nobody except Paliyath Raman Valiyachan, the prime minister of Maharaja of Cochin, could recover it. The present church at Vallarpadamis built on land donated by Paliyath Raman Valiyachan. A sanctuary lamp which he donated has been burning day and night from 1676 onwards in his honour.

In May 1752 a miracle is believed to have taken place which made Vallarpadam a centre of pilgrimage. In Vallarpadam there was a young Nair lady named Meenakshi Amma, who was a member of a noble family called Palliyil Veedu. Together with her son she was sailing to Mattancherry. There arose a storm and the boat capsized. Meenakshi Amma and her son went deep down into the backwater. She promised to devote the rest of her life to Mary’s service if she and her child were saved. It was a promise she kept. On the third day, as per instructions in a dream, the parish priest asked the fishermen to cast net in the river, and Meenakshi Amma and her son were rescued. After her death, the church put up the picture of Meenakshiamma and her child alongside the painting of Mary.

Festival
The Feast of Vallarpadathamma is celebrated from 16 to 24 September every year. Thousands of pilgrims come to Vallarpadam to participate in the feast, especially on 24 September.

Photo gallery

See also
 Roman Catholic Archdiocese of Verapoly
 Basilica of Our Lady of Good Health
 Basilica of Our lady of Mount Carmel & St Joseph
 St. Philomena's Forane Church & St. Chavara Pilgrim Centre
 Latin Catholics of Malabar

References

External links

 Official Website
 Vallarpadam Shrine

1676 establishments in Asia
Religious organizations established in the 1670s
Tourist attractions in Kochi
Basilica churches in Kerala
Christian organizations established in the 17th century
Roman Catholic churches in Kochi
Roman Catholic shrines in India